Robert Weil (1881–1960) was an Austrian writer for stage and screen.

Under the pseudonym Gustav Holm, he co-authored (with Ernst Décsey) a play Sissys Brautfahrt ("Sissy's bridal journey") which was later used for the libretto of the well-known operetta  by Ernst and Hubert Marischka.

He also used the pseudonym "Homunkulus".

Selected filmography
 I Do Not Want to Know Who You Are (1932)
 Three on a Honeymoon (1932)
 Honeymoon Trip (1933)
 Adventure on the Southern Express (1934)
 Spring Parade (1934)
 Abschiedswalzer (1934)
  (1934)
 Winter Night's Dream (1935)
 Stradivari (1935)
  (1935)
 Forget Me Not (1935)
  (1936)
 The King Steps Out (1936)
 The Charm of La Boheme (1937)
 Immer wenn ich glücklich bin (1938)
  (1938)
 Addio Mimí! (1949)
  (1955)

Further reading
http://www.kabarettarchiv.at/Bio/Weil.htm

1881 births
1950 deaths
Austrian male dramatists and playwrights
Writers from Vienna
20th-century Austrian dramatists and playwrights
20th-century Austrian male writers